The President's Commission on Care for America's Returning Wounded Warriors, also known as the Dole-Shalala Commission, was established on March 6, 2007, when U.S. President George W. Bush signed . The Commission was established to examine and recommend improvements to the effectiveness and quality of transition from a return to military service or civilian society, health care, benefits, outreach to Service members, and awareness by Service members of health care and benefits programs.

Work process   
The Commissioners visited the United States Department of Defense (DoD), United States Department of Veterans Affairs (VA), and private-sector treatment facilities; interviewed injured service members and their families, health care professionals, and program managers; conducted a survey of injured service members; reviewed letters and emails from Service members, veterans, family members, and health care personnel; and analyzed recommendations of past commissions and task forces.  This Commission had the unique task of evaluating the entire continuum of care instead of analyzing discrete systems and processes as similar commissions had done.

Findings 

The Commission found consistent reports of high-quality battlefield medicine care provided by military and VA medical staff.  Many of the report's findings focused on "seriously injured" service members, as identified by receipt of the one-time payment from Traumatic Servicemembers' Group Life Insurance to severely injured service members.

The Commission found a strong correlation between the feedback received about DoD/VA health care and the feedback typically received about health care from the private sector, such as poor care coordination and continuity, ineffective information technology systems, enduring stigma threatening those who seek mental health care, and inadequate long-term rehabilitation and staff shortages.

Recommendations   
This Commission made six recommendations with "action steps" to implement each recommendation.  Also, each "action step" directs specific action roles to the VA, DoD, United States Congress, or some combination of these three entities.

 Immediately Create Comprehensive Recovery Plans to Provide the Right Care and Support at the Right Time in the Right Place
 Develop integrated care teams
 Create Recovery Plans
 Develop corps of Recovery Coordinators (with Public Health Service)
 Completely Restructure the Disability and Compensation Systems
 Clarify the objectives of DoD and VA disability programs
 Create a single, comprehensive medical exam
 Provide lifetime TRICARE benefits for combat-injured
 Restructure VA disability payments
 Determine appropriate length and amounts of transition payments
 Update and keep current the disability rating schedule
 Develop flexibility within Vocational Rehabilitation and Education (VRE) program
 Aggressively Prevent and Treat Post-Traumatic Stress Disorder and Traumatic Brain Injury
 Enable all Iraq & Afghanistan veterans who need PTSD care to receive it from the VA
 Address shortage in mental health professionals
 Establish and expand networks of experts in PTSD and TBI
 Expand training regarding PTSD and TBI
 Develop or disseminate clinical practice guidelines
 Significantly Strengthen Support for Families
 Expand eligibility for TRICARE respite care and aide and attendant care
 Expand caregiver training for families
 Cover family members under the Family Medical Leave Act
 Rapidly Transfer Patient Information Between DoD and VA
 Make patient information available to all personnel who need it, initially in readable form
 Continue efforts for a fully interoperable information system
 Develop a user-friendly single web portal for service members and veterans
 Strongly Support Walter Reed By Recruiting and Retaining First-Rate Professionals Through 2011
 Assure adequate resources
 Strengthen recruitment and retention of needed administrative and clinical staff

Press coverage  
 25 July 2007 - Panel Calls for Changes in Military Medical Care National Public Radio coverage of final report of the President's Commission on Care for America's Returning Wounded Warriors.

References 

Care for America's Returning Wounded Warriors, President's Commission on
Veterans' affairs in the United States
Presidency of George W. Bush